Dead Gorgeous is a 2010 children's supernatural fantasy television show which premiered on 15 March 2010 in Britain and 5 April 2010 in Australia. It was produced by Burberry Productions and Coolabi Productions with funding from Screen Australia, and directed by Stephen Maxwell Johnson and Wayne Blair.

Plot
Dead Gorgeous follows the adventures of three sisters, Rebecca, Sophie and Hazel Ainsworth who died in a terrible carriage crash along with their beloved nanny, during the Victorian era. Feeling they did not get the chance to experience life properly, Rebecca applies to the ghost council for another chance of life. Their wish is granted but they return 150 years after their death to find their home has been turned into a private boarding school. They are "Living Ghosts" who appear to be normal people but have ghostly abilities such as walking through walls. Unable to reveal their secret the sisters are forced to fit into the 21st century as students in the school that used to be their home. As three refined, old-fashioned young ladies, they are baffled by modern life but with the help of their ghost-guardian Agatha, and a motley selection of ghosts they manage to survive the challenges modern culture brings. They struggle during their attempt to adjust to modern life but do get helped by these people.

Cast
 Melissa Howard as Rebecca – 16-year-old Rebecca Catherine Eilzabeth is the oldest of the Ainsworth sisters. When the sisters are killed in a tragic accident she feels particularly cheated as there was romance in the air. Rebecca applies to the ghost council for a second chance at life for her and her sisters. Rebecca adapts well to life in the 21st century, wanting to fit in and enjoy all the luxury and adventure the new life has to offer. She also is quite into the new trends and will go to great lengths to become popular or accepted, she is head over heels in love with David who is too brainless to notice. Jonathan has strong feelings for Rebecca but is too shy to show it too greatly.
 Poppy Lee Friar as Sophie – 15-year-old Sophia Constance Etheldred is the middle Ainsworth sister. When the girls begin their life in the modern world Sophie is not happy that Rebecca applied for the girls to be given a second chance without discussing it with her. This new, modern world is not a comfortable place for Sophie. Skimpy sports uniforms embarrass her. She would rather be painting or doing her needlework than just about any pastime the 21st century has to offer. She likes long clothing and is quite modest and deep inside still disgusted about the state of the new world and may never adapt but she tries her hardest to fit into this new strange world. Her best friend is Charlie. Friar received an AACTA nomination for her portrayal of the character.
Alexandra Coppinger as Hazel – 12-year-old Hazel is the youngest of the three Ainsworth sisters. She is adventurous and also a lot of fun but at times can be very affectionate and caring. The relationship between her and her sisters is very strong and she has easily adapted to new technology (she learns how to rap and teaches her sisters) and would be most pleased if Sophie were more interested in the 21st century's technology offerings. Her best friend is Mattie. She has noticed Jonathan's affections for Rebecca, when Rebecca cannot realize them.
Blake Davis as Jonathan – Jonathan is intrigued by the new girls at school and quickly befriends the Ainsworth sisters. He helps them make their way through the new and baffling world of the 21st century. It doesn't take long before he discovers the girls' secret; at first he is terrified and afraid but he slowly gets used to it and keeps their secret. Jonathan has strong feelings for Rebecca however he is too shy too show them obviously.
Chris Milligan as David – David might not be the smartest boy at school but he is probably the most handsome, which makes him incredibly popular with the girls. It doesn't take long before Rebecca sets her sights on him, but there are others who are also vying for David's attentions. David would much rather play sport than spend time in the classroom.
Aisha Dee as Christine – Christine is one of the coolest girls in school. Her parents are wealthy and that could be one reason why everyone wants to be her friend. When Rebecca meets Christine and her 'gang' of friends she desperately wants to be accepted. Rebecca will go to extraordinary lengths to be one of Christine's friends which gives Christine a lot of opportunities to take advantage of her. Christine knows what she wants and she knows how to get it. Although she seems quite rough and hard sometimes on the outside, she has a soft and kind side on the inside, but she doesn't like to show it.
Jay Kennedy Harris as Charlie – Charlie is a bit of a nerd. He is one of those boys that nobody hates, but he is nobody's close friend either. His school mates don't understand Charlie. He is the boy who meditates rather than mucking around. He is a bit out there which draws him to the Ainsworth sisters, who are also outsiders in their own way.
Gerry Connolly as Mr Griffith – Headmaster Griffiths is an avuncular, likeable headmaster who would rather avoid a problem than confront it. He is constantly trying to calm Haiwyn Sinclaire down about the mysterious Ainsworth girls.
Stella Silagy as Mattie – Mattie pals up with Hazel and is loyal to her new friend, even though she thinks she's a little weird. While many of the other kids in school think Mattie is a bit of a nerd because she likes science and isn't a social butterfly, Hazel appreciates Mattie's loyalty and friendship. Mattie is very supportive and would do pretty big things to help Hazel.
Julie Forsyth as Haiwyn Sinclaire (aka Miss Sinclair) – Haiwyn Sinclaire is the deputy head of Ainsbury School and the art teacher. A keen follower of the 'ghostly other side' Haiwyn knows there is something very different about the Ainsworth sisters but can't put her finger on it. She'd like to find a reason to expel them, but the sisters always manage to outwit her.
Julie Eckersley as Agatha Heggleby – Agatha is Rebecca, Sophie and Hazel's ghost guardian. This motorcycle riding ghost is flamboyant, outrageous and just a little scatter-brained. She has set up 'home' with her ghostly friends, Buddy, Sophus and Grendel, in the Ainsworth family graveyard. Agatha and the ghostly friends are always there for the sisters but sometimes their advice can be a little 'out of this world'.

Production
The show is Produced by Burberry Productions and Coolabi Productions in association with the ABC and the BBC, as well as Screen Australia and Film Victoria. It was filmed on location at Ripponlea and at La Bassa (a mansion in Melbourne) and Ruyton Girls' School.

Stephen Maxwell Johnson directed nine episodes, while Wayne Blair directed the other four.

Pilot
In 2003, Nickelodeon UK ordered a pilot to the show which was shot entirely in Britain. Nickelodeon did not pick the series up and it was pitched to the BBC, who came on board. Subsequently, the ABC and Nickelodeon Germany became involved and the series was filmed in Australia with a different cast. The show also had a slightly different setup and a slight difference in character personalities. Footage from the pilot is available on YouTube.

Episodes
The thirteen episodes are as follows:

Release
The show first aired in Australia on ABC1 on 5 April 2010.

DVD releases
The ABC released a DVD of Dead Gorgeous featuring the first 7 episodes, with a second DVD later released with the remaining episodes.

International broadcasts

See also
 List of ghost films

References

External links
 
 

Australian Broadcasting Corporation original programming
2010 Australian television series debuts
2010 Australian television series endings
Australian children's fantasy television series
BBC children's television shows
British children's fantasy television series
Television series about children
Television series about ghosts
Television series about sisters
Television series about teenagers